The following is a list of men's champions of the Metro Atlantic Athletic Conference Division I ice hockey conference, including champions of the defunct conference's playoff tournament.

Championships by season

Membership timeline

Championships by school

* currently members of Atlantic Hockey

Location of Men's MAAC tournaments
1999: Hart Center, Worcester, Massachusetts
2000 thru 2001: UConn Ice Arena, Storrs, Connecticut
2002: Hart Center, Worcester, Massachusetts
2003: Tate Rink, West Point, New York

See also
MAAC Tournament Most Valuable Player

References

Metro Atlantic Athletic Conference